Howard Weyers (March 29, 1934 – November 14, 2018) was an American football player and assistant coach.  He served as assistant coach at Rutgers University, Columbia University, University of Pittsburgh, Miami University, and Michigan State University (1973–1976).

Weyers graduated from Thiel College in 1956.

NCAA violations and resignation
Weyers left Michigan State amid accusations of recruiting violations by the NCAA.

Weyco smoking ban
Weyers was again at the center of controversy when his company Weyco banned smoking for all of its 200 employees in January 2005. The strict no-smoking policy imposed random screenings, and termination upon failure of a test.

References

1934 births
2018 deaths
Thiel College alumni
Rutgers Scarlet Knights football coaches
Columbia Lions football coaches
Pittsburgh Panthers football coaches
Michigan State Spartans football coaches